In enzymology, a N-acylmannosamine kinase is an enzyme that catalyzes the chemical reaction

ATP + N-acyl-D-mannosamine  ADP + N-acyl-D-mannosamine 6-phosphate

Thus, the two substrates of this enzyme are ATP and N-acyl-D-mannosamine, whereas its two products are ADP and N-acyl-D-mannosamine 6-phosphate.

This enzyme belongs to the family of transferases, specifically those transferring phosphorus-containing groups (phosphotransferases) with an alcohol group as acceptor.  The systematic name of this enzyme class is ATP:N-acyl-D-mannosamine 6-phosphotransferase. Other names in common use include acylmannosamine kinase (phosphorylating), acetylamidodeoxymannokinase, acetylmannosamine kinase, acylaminodeoxymannokinase, acylmannosamine kinase, N-acyl-D-mannosamine kinase, N-acetylmannosamine kinase, and ATP:N-acetylmannosamine 6-phosphotransferase.  This enzyme participates in aminosugars metabolism.

Structural studies

As of late 2007, only one structure has been solved for this class of enzymes, with the PDB accession code .

References

 
 
 

EC 2.7.1
Enzymes of known structure